The two-nation theory is an ideology of religious nationalism that influenced the decolonisation of the British Raj in South Asia. According to this ideology, Indian Muslims and Indian Hindus are two separate nations, with their own customs, religion, and traditions; consequently, both socially and morally, Muslims should have a separate homeland within the decolonised British Indian Empire. 

The theory that religion is the determining factor in defining the nationality of Indian Muslims was promoted by Muhammad Ali Jinnah and became the basis of Pakistan Movement. The Two-Nation theory argued for a different state for the Muslims of the British Indian Empire as Muslims would not be able to succeed politically in a Hindu-majority India; this interpretation nevertheless promised a democratic state where Muslims and non-Muslims would be treated equally. 

Opposition to the two-nation theory came chiefly from Hindus, and some Muslims, (the Muslim League having won a near-unanimous majority in the Muslim-majority districts in the provincial elections of 1946.) They conceived of India as a single Indian nation, of which Hindus and Muslims are two intertwined communities. 
The state of India officially rejected the two-nation theory and chose to be a secular state, enshrining the concepts of religious pluralism and composite nationalism in its constitution.  Kashmir, a Muslim-majority region three-fifths of which is administered by the Republic of India, and the oldest dispute before the United Nations, is a venue for both competing ideologies of South Asian nationhood.

History 
In general, the British colonial government and British commentators made "it a point of speaking of Indians as the people of India and avoid speaking of an Indian nation." This was cited as a key reason for British control of the country: since Indians were not a nation, they were theoretically not capable of national self-government. While some Indian leaders insisted that Indians were one nation, others agreed that Indians were not yet a nation but there was "no reason why in the course of time they should not grow into a nation." Scholars note that a national consciousness has always been present in "India", or more broadly the Indian subcontinent, even if it was not articulated in modern terms. Indian historians such as Shashi Tharoor have claimed that the partition of India was a result of the divide-and-rule policies of the British colonial government initiated after Hindus and Muslims united together to fight against the British East India Company in the Indian Rebellion of 1857.

Similar debates on national identity existed within India at the linguistic, provincial and religious levels. While some argued that Indian Muslims were one nation, others argued they were not. Some, such as Liaquat Ali Khan (later Prime Minister of Pakistan) argued that Indian Muslims were not yet a nation, but could be forged into one.

According to the Pakistan's government official chronology, Muhammad bin Qasim is often referred to as the first Pakistani. While Prakash K. Singh attributes the arrival of Muhammad bin Qasim as the first step towards the creation of Pakistan. Muhammad Ali Jinnah considered the Pakistan movement to have started when the first Muslim put a foot in the Gateway of Islam.

Roots of Muslim separatism in Colonial India (17th century–1940s) 

It is generally believed in Pakistan that the movement for Muslim self-awakening and identity was started by Ahmad Sirhindi (1564–1624), who fought against emperor Akbar's religious syncretist Din-i Ilahi movement and is thus considered "for contemporary official Pakistani historians" to be the founder of the Two-nation theory, and was particularly intensified under the Muslim reformer Shah Waliullah (1703-1762) who, because he wanted to give back to Muslims their self-consciousness during the decline of the Mughal empire and the rise of the non-Muslim powers like the Marathas, Jats and Sikhs, launched a mass-movement of the religious education which made "them conscious of their distinct nationhood which in turn culminated in the form of Two Nation Theory and ultimately the creation of Pakistan."

Akbar Ahmed also considers Haji Shariatullah (1781–1840) and Syed Ahmad Barelvi (1786–1831) to be the forerunners of the Pakistan movement, because of their purist and militant reformist movements targeting the Muslim masses, saying that "reformers like Waliullah, Barelvi and Shariatullah were not demanding a Pakistan in the modern sense of nationhood. They were, however, instrumental in creating an awareness of the crisis looming for the Muslims and the need to create their own political organization. What Sir Sayyed did was to provide a modern idiom in which to express the quest for Islamic identity."

Thus, many Pakistanis often quote  modernist and reformist scholar Syed Ahmad Khan (1817–1898) as the architect of the two-nation theory. For instance, Sir Syed, in a January 1883 speech in Patna, talked of two different nations, even if his own approach was conciliatory:

However, the formation of the Indian National Congress was seen politically threatening and he dispensed with composite Indian nationalism. In an 1887 speech, he said:

In 1888, in a critical assessment of the Indian National Congress, which promoted composite nationalism among all the castes and creeds of colonial India, he also considered Muslims to be a separate nationality among many others:

In 1925, during the Aligarh session of the All-India Muslim League, which he chaired, Justice Abdur Rahim (1867–1952) was one of the first to openly articulate on how Muslims and Hindu constitute two nations, and while it would become common rhetoric, later on, the historian S. M. Ikram says that it "created quite a sensation in the twenties":

More substantially and influentially than Justice Rahim, or the historiography of British administrators, the poet-philosopher Muhammad Iqbal (1877–1938) provided the philosophical exposition and Barrister Muhammad Ali Jinnah (1871–1948) translated it into the political reality of a nation-state.

Some Hindu nationalists also tended to believe Hindus and Muslims are different peoples, as illustrated by a statement made by Vinayak Damodar Savarkar in 1937 during the 19th session of the Hindu Mahasabha in Ahmedabad regarding two nations -

The All-India Muslim League, in attempting to represent Indian Muslims, felt that the Muslims of the subcontinent were a distinct and separate nation from the Hindus. At first they demanded separate electorates, but when they opined that Muslims would not be safe in a Hindu-dominated India, they began to demand a separate state. The League demanded self-determination for Muslim-majority areas in the form of a sovereign state promising minorities equal rights and safeguards in these Muslim majority areas.

Many scholars argue that the creation of Pakistan through the partition of India was orchestrated by an elite class of Muslims in colonial India, not the common man. A large number of Islamic political parties, religious schools, and organizations opposed the partition of India and advocated a composite nationalism of all the people of the country in opposition to British rule (especially the All India Azad Muslim Conference).

On the other hand, Ian Copland, in his book discussing the end of the British rule in the Indian subcontinent, precises that it was not an élite-driven movement alone, who are said to have birthed separatism "as a defence against the threats posed to their social position by the introduction of representative government and competitive recruitment to the public service", but that the Muslim masses participated into it massively because of the religious polarization which had been created by Hindu revivalism towards the last quarter of the 19th century, especially with the openly anti-Islamic Arya Samaj and the whole cow protection movement, and "the fact that some of the loudest spokesmen for the Hindu cause and some of the biggest donors to the Arya Samaj and the cow protection movement came from the Hindu merchant and money lending communities, the principal agents of lower-class Muslim economic dependency, reinforced this sense of insecurity", and because of Muslim resistance, "each year brought new riots" so that "by the end of the century, Hindu-Muslim relations had become so soured by this deadly roundabout of blood-letting, grief and revenge that it would have taken a mighty concerted effort by the leaders of the two communities to repair the breach."

Relevant opinions 

The theory asserted that India was not a nation. It also asserted that Hindus and Muslims of the Indian subcontinent were each a nation, despite great variations in language, culture and ethnicity within each of those groups. To counter critics who said that a community of radically varying ethnicities and languages who were territorially intertwined with other communities could not be a nation, the theory said that the concept of nation in the East was different from that in the West. In the East, religion was "a complete social order which affects all the activities in life" and "where the allegiance of people is divided on the basis of religion, the idea of territorial nationalism has never succeeded."

It asserted that "a Muslim of one country has far more sympathies with a Muslim living in another country than with a non-Muslim living in the same country." Therefore, "the conception of Indian Muslims as a nation may not be ethnically correct, but socially it is correct."

Muhammad Iqbal had also championed the notion of pan-Islamic nationhood (see: Ummah) and strongly condemned the concept of a territory-based nation as anti-Islamic: "In tāzah xudā'ōⁿ mēⁿ, baṙā sab sē; waṭan hai: Jō pairahan is kā hai; woh maẕhab kā, kafan hai... (Of all these new [false] gods, the biggest; is the motherland (waṭan): Its garment; is [actually] the death-shroud, of religion...)" He had stated the dissolution of ethnic nationalities into a unified Muslim society (or millat) as the ultimate goal: "Butān-e raⁿŋg ō-xūⁿ kō tōṙ kar millat mēⁿ gum hō jā; Nah Tūrānī rahē bāqī, nah Īrānī, nah Afġānī (Destroy the idols of color and blood ties, and merge into the Muslim society; Let no Turanians remain, neither Iranians, nor Afghans)".

Pakistan, Or the Partition of India (1945) 

In his 1945 book Pakistan, Or the Partition of India, Indian statesman and Buddhist Bhimrao Ramji Ambedkar wrote a sub-chapter titled "If Muslims truly and deeply desire Pakistan, their choice ought to be accepted". He asserted that, if the Muslims were bent on the creation of Pakistan, the demand should be conceded in the interest of the safety of India. He asks whether Muslims in the army could be trusted to defend India in the event of Muslims invading India or in the case of a Muslim rebellion. "[W]hom would the Indian Muslims in the army side with?" he questioned. According to him, the assumption that Hindus and Muslims could live under one state if they were distinct nations was but "an empty sermon, a mad project, to which no sane man would agree". In direct relation to the two-nation theory, he notably says in the book:

Explanations by Muslim leaders advocating separatism

In Muhammad Ali Jinnah's All India Muslim League presidential address delivered in Lahore, on March 22, 1940, he explained:

In 1944, Jinnah said:

In an interview with British journalist Beverley Nichols, he said in 1943: 

In May 1947, he took an entirely different approach when he told Mountbatten, who was in charge of British India's transition to independence: 

Mountbatten replied:

Support of Ahmadis and some Barelvis

The Ahmadiyya Muslim Jama'at staunchly supported Jinnah and his two-nation theory. Chaudary Zafarullah Khan, an Ahmadi leader, drafted the Lahore Resolution that separatist leaders interpreted as calling for the creation of Pakistan. Chaudary Zafarullah Khan was asked by Jinnah to represent the Muslim League to the Radcliffe Commission, which was charged with drawing the line between an independent India and newly created Pakistan. Ahmadis argued to try to ensure that the city of Qadian, India would fall into the newly created state of Pakistan, though they were unsuccessful in doing so  Upon the creation of Pakistan, many Ahmadis held prominent posts in government positions; in the Indo-Pakistani War of 1947–1948, in which Pakistan tried to capture the state of Jammu and Kashmir, the Ahmadiyya Muslim Jama'at created the Furqan Force to fight Indian troops.

Some Barelvi scholars supported the Muslim League and Pakistan's demand, arguing that befriending 'unbelievers' was forbidden in Islam. Other Barelvi scholars strongly opposed the partition of India and the League's demand to be seen as the only representative of Indian Muslims.

Savarkar's ideas on "two nations"

According to Ambedkar, Savarkar's idea of "two nations" did not translate into two separate countries. B. R. Ambedkar summarised Savarkar's position thus:

But Ambedkar also expressed his surprise at the agreement between Savarkar and Jinnah on describing Hindus and Muslims as two nations. He noticed that both were different in implementation:

Opposition to the partition of India

All India Azad Muslim Conference
The All India Azad Muslim Conference, which represented nationalist Muslims, gathered in Delhi in April 1940 to voice its support for an independent and united India. The British government, however, sidelined this nationalist Muslim organization and came to see Jinnah, who advocated separatism, as the sole representative of Indian Muslims.

Khan Abdul Ghaffar Khan and the Khudai Khidmatgar
Khan Abdul Ghaffar Khan, also known as the "Frontier Gandhi" or "Sarhadi Gandhi", was not convinced by the two-nation theory and wanted a single united India as a home for both Hindus and Muslims. He was from the North West Frontier Province of British India, now in present-day Pakistan. He believed that the partition would be harmful to the Muslims of the Indian subcontinent. After partition, following a majority of the NWFP voters going for Pakistan in a controversial referendum, Ghaffar Khan resigned himself to their choice and took an oath of allegiance to the new country on February 23, 1948, during a session of the Constituent Assembly, and his second son, Wali Khan, "played by the rules of the political system" as well.

Mahatma Gandhi's view
Mahatma Gandhi was against the division of India on the basis of religion. He once wrote:

Maulana Sayyid Abul Kalam Azad's view
Maulana Sayyid Abul Kalam Azad was a member of the Indian National Congress and was known as a champion of Hindu-Muslim unity. He argued that Muslims were native to India and had made India their home. Cultural treasures of undivided India such as the Red Fort of Delhi to the Taj Mahal of Agra to the Badshahi Mosque of Lahore reflected an Indo-Islamic cultural legacy in the whole country, which would remain inaccessible to Muslims if they were divided through a partition of India. He opposed the partition of India for as long as he lived.

View of the Deobandi ulema 

The two-nation theory and the partition of India were vehemently opposed by the vast majority of Deobandi Islamic religious scholars, being represented by the Jamiat Ulema-e-Hind that supported both the All India Azad Muslim Conference and Indian National Congress. The principal of Darul Uloom Deoband, Maulana Hussain Ahmad Madni, not only opposed the two-nation theory but sought to redefine the Indian Muslim nationhood. He advocated composite Indian nationalism, believing that nations in modern times were formed on the basis of land, culture, and history.  He and other leading Deobandi ulama endorsed territorial nationalism, stating that Islam permitted it. Despite opposition from most Deobandi scholars, Ashraf Ali Thanvi and Mufti Muhammad Shafi instead tried to justify the two-nation theory and concept of Pakistan.

Post-partition debate
Since the partition, the theory has been subjected to animated debates and different interpretations on several grounds. Mr. Niaz Murtaza, a Pakistani scholar with a doctoral degree from the Berkeley-based University of California, wrote in his Dawn column (April 11, 2017):

Many common Muslims criticized the two-nation theory as favoring only the elite class of Muslims, causing the deaths of over one million innocent people.

In his memoirs entitled Pathway to Pakistan (1961), Chaudhry Khaliquzzaman, a prominent leader of the Pakistan movement and the first president of the Pakistan Muslim League, has written: "The two-nation theory, which we had used in the fight for Pakistan, had created not only bad blood against the Muslims of the minority provinces but also an ideological wedge, between them and the Hindus of India.". He further wrote: "He (Huseyn Shaheed Suhrawardy) doubted the utility of the two-nation theory, which to my mind also had never paid any dividends to us, but after the partition, it proved positively injurious to the Muslims of India, and on a long-view basis for Muslims everywhere."

According to Khaliquzzaman, on August 1, 1947, Jinnah invited the Muslim League members of India's constituent assembly to a farewell meeting at his Delhi house.

To Indian nationalists, the British government intentionally divided India in order to keep the nation weak.

In his August 11, 1947 speech, Jinnah had spoken of composite Pakistani nationalism, effectively negating the faith-based nationalism that he had advocated in his speech of March 22, 1940. In his August 11 speech, he said that non-Muslims would be equal citizens of Pakistan and that there would be no discrimination against them. "You may belong to any religion or caste or creed that has nothing to do with the business of the state." On the other hand, far from being an ideological point (transition from faith-based to composite nationalism), it was mainly tactical: Dilip Hiro says that "extracts of this speech were widely disseminated" in order to abort the communal violence in Punjab and the NWFP, where Muslims and Sikhs-Hindus were butchering each other and which greatly disturbed Jinnah on a personal level, but "the tactic had little, if any, impact on the horrendous barbarity that was being perpetrated on the plains of Punjab." Another Indian scholar, Venkat Dhulipala, who in his book Creating a New Medina precisely shows that Pakistan was meant to be a new Medina, an Islamic state, and not only a state for Muslims, so it was meant to be ideological from the beginning with no space for composite nationalism, in an interview also says that the speech "was made primarily keeping in mind the tremendous violence that was going on", that it was "directed at protecting Muslims from even greater violence in areas where they were vulnerable", "it was pragmatism", and to vindicate this, the historian goes on to say that "after all, a few months later, when asked to open the doors of the Muslim League to all Pakistanis irrespective of their religion or creed, the same Jinnah refused, saying that Pakistan was not ready for it."
	
The theory has faced scepticism because Muslims did not entirely separate from Hindus and about one-third of all Muslims continued to live in post-partition India as Indian citizens alongside a much larger Hindu majority. The subsequent partition of Pakistan itself into the present-day nations of Pakistan and Bangladesh was cited as proof both that Muslims did not constitute one nation and that religion alone was not a defining factor for nationhood.

Impact of Bangladesh's creation 
Some historians have claimed that the theory was a creation of a few Muslim intellectuals. Altaf Hussain, founder of the Muttahida Qaumi Movement believes that history has proved the two-nation theory wrong. He contended, "The idea of Pakistan was dead at its inception when the majority of Muslims (in Muslim-minority areas of India) chose to stay back after partition, a truism reiterated in the creation of Bangladesh in 1971". The Pakistani scholar Tarek Fatah termed the two-nation theory "absurd".

In his Dawn column Irfan Husain, a well-known political commentator, observed that it has now become an "impossible and exceedingly boring task of defending a defunct theory". However some Pakistanis, including a retired Pakistani brigadier, Shaukat Qadir, believe that the theory could only be disproved with the reunification of independent Bangladesh, and Republic of India.

According to Professor Sharif al Mujahid, one of the most preeminent experts on Jinnah and the Pakistan movement, the two-nation theory was relevant only in the pre-1947 subcontinental context. He is of the opinion that the creation of Pakistan rendered it obsolete because the two nations had transformed themselves into Indian and Pakistani nations. Muqtada Mansoor, a columnist for Express newspaper, has quoted Farooq Sattar, a prominent leader of the MQM, as saying that his party did not accept the two-nation theory. "Even if there was such a theory, it has sunk in the Bay of Bengal."

In 1973, there was a movement against the recognition of Bangladesh in Pakistan. Its main argument was that Bangladesh's recognition would negate the two-nation theory. However, Salman Sayyid says that 1971 is not so much the failure of the two-nation theory and the advent of a united Islamic polity despite ethnic and cultural difference, but more so the defeat of "a Westphalian-style nation-state, which insists that linguistic, cultural and ethnic homogeneity is necessary for high 'sociopolitical cohesion'. The break-up of united Pakistan should be seen as another failure of this Westphalian-inspired Kemalist model of nation-building, rather than an illustration of the inability of Muslim political identity to sustain a unified state structure."

Some Bangladesh academics have rejected the notion that 1971 erased the legitimacy of the two-nation theory as well, like Akhand Akhtar Hossain, who thus notes that, after independence, "Bengali ethnicity soon lost influence as a marker of identity for the country's majority population, their Muslim identity regaining prominence and differentiating them from the Hindus of West Bengal", or Taj ul-Islam Hashmi, who says that Islam came back to Bangladeshi politics in August 1975, as the death of Sheikh Mujibur Rahman "brought Islam-oriented state ideology by shunning secularism and socialism." He has quoted Basant Chatterjee, an Indian Bengali journalist, as rebuking the idea of the failure of two-nation theory, arguing that, had it happened, Muslim-majority Bangladesh would have joined Hindu-majority West Bengal in India.

J. N. Dixit, a former ambassador of India to Pakistan, thought the same, stating that Bangladeshis "wanted to emerge not only as an independent Bengali country but as an independent Bengali Muslim country. In this, they proved the British Viceroy Lord George Curzon (1899-1905) correct. His partition of Bengal in 1905 creating two provinces, one with a Muslim majority and the other with a Hindu majority, seems to have been confirmed by Bangladesh's emergence as a Muslim state. So one should not be carried away by the claim of the two-nation theory having been disproved." Dixit has narrated an anecdote. During Prime Minister Zulfikar Ali Bhutto's visit to Dhaka in July 1974, after Sheikh Mujibur Rahman went to Lahore to attend the Islamic summit in February 1974: "As the motorcade moved out, Mujib's car was decorated with garlands of chappals and anti-Awami League slogans were shouted together with slogans such as: "Bhutto Zindabad", and "Bangladesh-Pakistan Friendship Zindabad"." He opines that Bhutto's aim was "to revive the Islamic consciousness in Bangladesh" and "India might have created Bangladesh, but he would see that India would have to deal with not one, but two Pakistans, one in the west and another in the east."

Ethnic and provincial groups in Pakistan 

Several ethnic and provincial leaders in Pakistan also began to use the term "nation" to describe their provinces and argued that their very existence was threatened by the concept of amalgamation into a Pakistani nation on the basis that Muslims were one nation. It has also been alleged that the idea that Islam is the basis of nationhood embroils Pakistan too deeply in the affairs of other predominantly Muslim states and regions, prevents the emergence of a unique sense of Pakistani nationhood that is independent of reference to India, and encourages the growth of a fundamentalist culture in the country.

Also, because partition divided Indian Muslims into three groups (of roughly 190 million people each in India, Pakistan and Bangladesh) instead of forming a single community inside a united India that would have numbered about 570 million people and potentially exercised great influence over the entire subcontinent. So, the two-nation theory is sometimes alleged to have ultimately weakened the position of Muslims on the subcontinent and resulted in large-scale territorial shrinkage or skewing for cultural aspects that became associated with Muslims (e.g., the decline of Urdu language in India).

This criticism has received a mixed response in Pakistan. A poll conducted by Gallup Pakistan in 2011 shows that an overwhelming majority of Pakistanis held the view that separation from India was justified in 1947. Pakistani commentators have contended that two nations did not necessarily imply two states, and the fact that Bangladesh did not merge into India after separating from Pakistan supports the two-nation theory.

Others have stated that the theory is still valid despite the still-extant Muslim minority in India, and asserted variously that Indian Muslims have been "Hinduized" (i.e., lost much of their Muslim identity due to assimilation into Hindu culture), or that they are treated as an excluded or alien group by an allegedly Hindu-dominated India. Factors such as lower literacy and education levels among Indian Muslims as compared to Indian Hindus, longstanding cultural differences, and outbreaks of religious violence such as those occurring during the 2002 Gujarat riots in India are cited.

Pan-Islamic identity 

The emergence of a sense of identity that is pan-Islamic rather than Pakistani has been defended as consistent with the founding ideology of Pakistan and the concept that "Islam itself is a nationality," despite the commonly held notion of "nationality, to Muslims, is like idol worship." While some have emphasized that promoting the primacy of a pan-Islamic identity (over all other identities) is essential to maintaining a distinctiveness from India and preventing national "collapse", others have argued that the two-nation theory has served its purpose in "midwifing" Pakistan into existence and should now be discarded to allow Pakistan to emerge as a normal nation-state.

Post-partition perspectives in India
The state of India officially rejected the two-nation theory and chose to be a secular state, enshrining the concepts of religious pluralism and composite nationalism in its constitution.

Nevertheless, in post-independence India, the two-nation theory helped advance the cause of Hindu nationalist groups seeking to identify a "Hindu national culture" as the core identity of an Indian. This allows the acknowledgment of the common ethnicity of Indian Hindus and Muslims while requiring that all adopt a Hindu identity to be truly Indian. From the Hindu nationalist perspective, this concedes the ethnic reality that Indian Muslims are "flesh of our flesh and blood of our blood" but still presses for an officially recognized equation of national and religious identity, i.e., that "an Indian is a Hindu."

The theory and the very existence  of Pakistan has caused Indian far-right extremist groups to allege that Indian Muslims "cannot be loyal citizens of India" or any other non-Muslim nation, and are "always capable and ready to perform traitorous acts". Constitutionally, India rejects the two-nation theory and regards Indian Muslims as equal citizens. Reputed Indian politicians such as Shashi Tharoor have claimed that the partition of India was a result of the divide-and-rule policies of the British colonial government initiated after Hindus and Muslims united together to fight against the British East India Company in the Indian Rebellion of 1857.

See also

 Pakistanism
 Composite nationalism
 Madani–Iqbal debate

References

Bibliography

External links

 
 A critique of the Two Nation Theory: Sharpening the saw; by Varsha Bhosle; 26 July 1999; Rediff India
Story of the Nation divided by group connected by heart; two nation theory E-Gyankosh

Pakistani nationalism
Pakistan Movement
Segregation
Muhammad Ali Jinnah
Partition of India
Political terminology in Pakistan
Political ideologies
Constitution of Pakistan